Khakusy is a health resort with hot springs, located in the north of Buryatia, on the coast of Lake Baikal.

The hot Springs are located 700 meters from the shore of Lake Baikal. There are baths built at the water source in the pine forest.

The name "Khakusy" comes from the Evenk word meaning "heat", or "hot".

The Khakusy resort, founded in 1953, has 50 seats and running hot water in the baths. The resort is closed during autumn due to storms, and in the spring - because of the melting of ice on Lake Baikal. Khakusy is located in the wild, far from populated areas, so getting here can be done from Nizhneangarsk on a boat on Lake Baikal, or from Severobaikalsk by helicopter.

Gallery

Sources 

Горячие источники Хакусы
Лечебный курорт Хакусы (Бурятия)

Buildings and structures in Buryatia
Lake Baikal
Tourist attractions in Buryatia